Peter Marshall (born 31 December 1942) is  a former Australian rules footballer who played with Collingwood in the Victorian Football League (VFL).

Marshall's disgraced grandson James Parsons formerly played for Australian Football League (AFL) club Geelong.

References

Sources
 Holmesby, R. & Main, J. (2014) The Encyclopedia of AFL Footballers: every AFL/VFL player since 1897 (10th ed.), BAS Publishing: Seaford, Victoria. .

External links 
	
Profile at Collingwood FC

1942 births
Australian rules footballers from Victoria (Australia)
Collingwood Football Club players
Dandenong Football Club players
Living people